The Ibis GS-501 Urraco (Magpie) is a Colombian homebuilt aircraft that was designed and produced by Ibis Aircraft of Cali, introduced in 2000. The aircraft is supplied as a complete ready-to-fly-aircraft or as a kit for amateur construction.

Design and development
The GS-501 Urraco features a strut-braced high-wing, a two-seats-in-side-by-side configuration enclosed cabin with vertically-hinged doors, fixed tricycle landing gear with wheel pants and a single engine in tractor configuration.

The aircraft is made from sheet aluminium "all-metal" construction, with the wing tips and cowling made from composite material. The wing is supported by V-struts and jury struts. Two wings are available, the SuperSTOL, with double slotted flaps and the Express. The main landing gear is sprung 7075-T6 aluminium, while the nose gear has lever suspension using rubber pucks and helical springs. The main wheels include hydraulic disc brakes.

Continental Motors, Inc. or Lycoming Engines powerplants up to  may also be fitted.

Operational history
By 2010 the company reported that 58 Urracos had been delivered.

Specifications (GS-501 Urraco)

References

External links

GS-501 Urraco
2000s Colombian civil utility aircraft
2000s Colombian ultralight aircraft
Single-engined tractor aircraft
High-wing aircraft
Homebuilt aircraft